Trechus avgolensis is a species of ground beetle in the subfamily Trechinae. It was described by Belousov & Kabak in 1998.

References

Further reading
 Belousov I., Kabak I., 1998 - To the knowledge of the genus Trechus from southern Kyrghyzstan (Coleoptera: Carabidae). Klapalekiana, 34: 1-30.

avgolensis
Beetles described in 1998